Ramón Luperón (born 24 May 1946) is a Cuban rower. He competed at the 1968 Summer Olympics, 1972 Summer Olympics and the 1976 Summer Olympics.

References

External links
 

1946 births
Living people
Cuban male rowers
Olympic rowers of Cuba
Rowers at the 1968 Summer Olympics
Rowers at the 1972 Summer Olympics
Rowers at the 1976 Summer Olympics
Place of birth missing (living people)
Pan American Games medalists in rowing
Pan American Games gold medalists for Cuba
Pan American Games bronze medalists for Cuba
Rowers at the 1967 Pan American Games
Rowers at the 1971 Pan American Games
Rowers at the 1975 Pan American Games
Medalists at the 1971 Pan American Games
20th-century Cuban people
21st-century Cuban people